Club de Regatas Bella Vista is an Argentine sports club from the Bella Vista district of Greater Buenos Aires. Founded in 1895 as a rowing club, Regatas later developed other sports activities, such as rugby union, field hockey, football and tennis.

The rugby team currently plays at the Top 12, the first division of the Unión de Rugby de Buenos Aires league system. On the other hand, the hockey sections compete in tournaments organised by the Buenos Aires Hockey Association (AHBA).

History
Club de Regatas Bella Vista was founded on February 14, 1895, by former members of the Buenos Aires Rowing Club who wanted to develop the sport of rowing in the city of Bella Vista. Most inhabitants of Bella Vista at the time had French origins; one of them, Enrique Goubat is credited as being the founding father of the club.

Rugby has always been played at the club but it has only been since the 1960s, with the acquisition of new lands and the construction of several new rugby pitches that the club became strong in the Unión de Rugby de Buenos Aires championship.

Regatas' best performance ever was during the 2002 championship, when the team reached the finals but was later defeated by San Isidro Club. On November, 2011, Bella Vista was relegated to the second division.

Regatas has achieved more success in the rugby sevens version of the game, winning the provincial tournament in 1985. The club underaged teams have also earned some success since the 1990s, winning the Under-19 title in 1999 and finishing second in the 2008 Under-22 championship. In 2005, the club won both the URBA U15 and U16 titles. In 2011 Regatas was relegated to Grupo II (second division) but just one year later the club returned to the top division of Argentine rugby league system.

Regatas returned to the top division (then "Grupo I") after defeating San Albano by 20–15 on November, 2012.

References

External links
 

r
R
r
R
R
R